Fujiwara no Moronaga was a Japanese politician, noble and musician during the Heian era. He was also known as Myo-On-In Daishokoku (Grand chancellor of Myo-On-In).

Life 
Moronaga was born into the northern branch of Fujiwara clan. He was the second son of Fujiwara no Yorinaga. He also retained a special relationship of "Quasi-son" with his grandfather Fujiwara no Tadajitsu. Thanks to this relationship with the ōdono Tadajistsu， Moronaga's political security was guaranteed and he was seen as one of the potential successor of the position of supreme chancellor Kanpaku.

In 1151, Moronaga was entered into the noble rank of Kugyo at the age of 14. In 1154, he was appointed the acting-middle counsellor. In 1156, Moronaga's father Yorinaga planned a rebellion against Emperor Go-Shirakawa and Fujiwara no Tadamichi. Historically, the rebellion was known as the Hōgen rebellion. The result of Yorinaga's rebellion was disastrous, he died during the rebellion while Moronaga was seen as a potential threat to the Japanese monarch. Consequently, Moronaga was ostracized to Tosa province.

In 1164, Moronaga was allowed to return to Kyoto. Soon after his return, his noble rank was also recovered. In 1177, Moronaga was promoted to the position of Daijō-daijin (chancellor).

Quite unfortunately for Moronaga, he became a political enemy of the military strongman Taira no Kiyomori who initiated a Coup d'etat in the year of 1179 and took over the power in Japan. He was dismissed together with Kanpaku Matsudono Motofusa and once more exiled. Later, he forfeited all his titles and became a Buddhist monk in Owari province. He died in Kyoto in the year of 1192 when he was 55 years old.

As a Musician 
Moronaga was a prominent musician of Heian era. He was especially skillful in playing Koto and Biwa. He wrote two books on Musicology:Jinchi Yoroku and Sango Yoroku. The two books contain numerous contemporary Chinese and Korean classical musical scores. In addition, he was a devoted worshiper of Benzaiten, the patron deity of Musicians in Japanese Buddhism.

According to sinologist Rao Zongyi, Sango Yoroku contains some of the oldest surviving musical scores of the instrument Pipa/Biwa.

Family 
Moronaga gave birth to three sons, one daughter and adopted one son from Fujiwara no Narichika.
Fujiwara no Morotae
Fujiwara no Moroyoshi
Fujiwara no Narimune
Chokaku
A daughter whose name is unknown.

References

External links 
Takuboku, one of the Biwa score recorded by Moronaga.
Shishang Liuquan, one of the ancient Chinese musical score recorded by Moronaga.

People of Heian-period Japan
Heian period Buddhist clergy
Japanese musicians